The 2011 season was SK Brann's 103rd season and their 25th consecutive season in the Norwegian Premier League.

Information

Squad

First team

Out on loan

Youth squad
Five players without professional contracts who are allowed to play three league matches each season for the first team.

Team kit
The team kits for the 2011 season are produced by Kappa and the main shirt sponsor is Sparebanken Vest. Other sponsors featured on the kit are BKK (shoulders), JM (chest), AXA (left arm), Chess (upper back), Norne Securities (front of shorts), Coop Obs! (back of shorts) and Tide (socks). As of the 2011 season the Norwegian FA has made it compulsory for all Premiership teams to feature player names on the back of the shirts. On Brann's shirts the player's names are printed below the squad number.

Transfers

Results 
The table below shows the results of all of SK Brann's official matches during the 2011-season.

Highlights
January 6: Brann signed the Polish goalkeeper Piotr Leciejewski  in a trade deal that sent Kenneth Udjus and Cato Hansen to the newly promoted Tippeligaen club Sogndal
January 13: Zsolt Korcsmár signed a three-year deal with Brann. The Hungarian center back spent the last half of the 2010 season on loan at Brann Stadion.
January 14: Christian Kalvenes signed a one-year extension to his contract. The local lad started his third spell with the club in June 2010 after a free transfer from Burnley.
January 26: Brann signed Juninho on a 6-month loan deal. The young Brazilian spent the last half of the 2010 season on loan at the club.
January 31: Erik Huseklepp was sold to the Serie A club Bari while Tijan Jaiteh went on a one-year loan  to Danish side Randers.
February 24: Brann signed Chukwuma "Bentley" Akabueze on a four-year deal. The young Nigerian spent four seasons at Odd Grenland before transferring to Brann.
February 8: Brann signed Nicolás Mezquida on a five-month loan deal from the Uruguayan champions C.A. Peñarol.
March 11: Erik Mjelde was announced as Brann's new Captain. The midfielder took over the armband from goalkeeper Håkon Opdal.
March 17: Brann announced the club's youth squad for the 2011 season. The five junior players are allowed to play up to three matches in the Premiership without a professional contract and the club does not have to pay training compensations (link) to the players former clubs. This was a new rule set by the Norwegian FA to make it easier for clubs to utilise young national players on the highest level of Norwegian football.
March 20: Brann opened the season with a 2-1 upset win against reigning champions Rosenborg. While Rosenborg were considered contenderes for the title by most experts before the season, Brann was deemed to have a tough season by most pundits, and many considered them relegation bound after losing key players like Erik Huseklepp, Petter Vaagan Moen and Jan Gunnar Solli and replacing them with Bosman players and youngsters. Kim Ojo scored and made an assist in his debut.
July 6: Brann signed Tadas Labukas on a six-month contract. The Lithuanian striker came on a free transfer from Arka Gdynia.
July 13: Nicolás Mezquida returned to C.A. Peñarol after Brann opted not to extend his loan deal.
July 15: Juninho returned to Desportivo Brasil after spending six months on loan at Brann.
July 18: Brann signed Maximiliano Bajter on a six-month loan deal from C.A. Peñarol.

References

2011
Norwegian football clubs 2011 season